The 1996 North Dakota State Bison football team was an American football team that represented North Dakota State University during the 1996 NCAA Division II football season as a member of the North Central Conference. In their tenth year under head coach Rocky Hager, the team compiled a 6–4 record.

Schedule

References

North Dakota State
North Dakota State Bison football seasons
North Dakota State Bison football